is a romantic comedy science fiction manga series written and illustrated by Yuichi Hiiragi. It has been serialized by Square Enix in Monthly Gangan Joker since January 2019. The series is also published in collected tankōbon volumes, which have been released in English by Yen Press since April 2021.

Premise 
One day, high school student Koushi Shirota catches the student council president and school madonna, Takane Takamine, changing her clothes. Later, when he notices that she received her test result of a 98%, she removes her panties, and he sees her receiving the exam result again, but this time with a perfect score. She soon confronts him and tells him that she has the ability to rewind time by taking off her underwear which then disappears. However, because he saw her naked, he is able to go back in time with her. She then forces him to be her "closet", that is, to replace her panties with fresh ones wherever she goes and uses the power, and to keep it all a secret from others..

Characters 

 The student council president and madonna who is highly admired by her peers. She seems to be the perfect student, but this is because she has the ability to rewind time by removing an article of underwear so she can undo any mistakes she has made. She acquired the ability from a time in her childhood when she was so embarrassed that she wet herself.  It is later revealed she has harboured feelings for Koushi since they were young and were at a park taking care of a stray cat, which Takane eventually adopted.  Although she tends to be demanding at school, she acts more jokingly and flirtatiously with him whenever the two are alone, stating that Koushi is a perverted virgin who fantasizes about all sorts of sexual situations concerning her.

 A high school student who becomes involved with Takane as her "closet", where he has to replace her underwear whenever she removes it. He is the only one who has seen Takane naked and is thus able to go back in time whenever she has a do-over. At first, he did it because he did not want to be criminalized for appearing to have sexually assaulted Takane.  He soon takes his task seriously to protect her from embarrassment and later tells the reader that he was unaware of her romantic intentions back then. 

 Koushi's childhood friend. She has light hair and works as an amateur model. They were friends in elementary school but went to different middle and high schools. She later joins Koushi at the same cram school. She likes hanging out with Koushi, which makes Takane jealous, but she is actually romantically interested in girls, with another girl as her lover. She has a small crush on Takane because of the latter's big boobs. She immediately notices that Takane likes Koushi so she tries to help her along.

Publication 
Please Put Them On, Takamine-san is written and illustrated by Yuichi Hiiragi. The series has been serialized by Square Enix in their magazine Gangan Joker since its February 2019 issue, which was released on January 22, 2019. They also released the series in collected tankōbon volumes since September 21, 2019. Yen Press began releasing these in English on April 6, 2021, after announcing that they had acquired the license at their New York Comic Con panel in 2020.

Volume list

Reception 
Rebecca Silverman of Anime News Network gave the first manga volume 2 out of 5 stars, criticizing the writing for at times being mean-spirited, but otherwise enjoyed the ludicrous factor and the fan service artwork. Lynzee Loveridge rated it a "No thanks", especially with the extortion condition "I can get sexy lady fanservice of all stripes without the loaded baggage of this shit."

In June 2021, Please Put Them On, Takamine-san was nominated for the seventh Next Manga Award in the Best Printed Manga category.

Works cited 
  "Ch." is shortened form for chapter and refers to a chapter number of the manga.

References

External links 
  at Square Enix  
 

Anime and manga about time travel
Gangan Comics manga
Romantic comedy anime and manga
Science fiction anime and manga
Yen Press titles